North Star Basketball Club is a basketball club affiliated to Basketball Ireland and Basketball Northern Ireland. The club is based in the city of Derry in Northern Ireland. North Star was originally established in the 1970s however the club dissolved in 1986. The club was reformed in 2002 and currently consists of one senior men’s teams and numerous junior teams. The club is Derry's only Basketball team.

History 
2002/03 Season
Senior Squad finished second in the Ulster Basketball League first division. Promoted to the Premier Division.

2003/04 Season
Second Senior squad formed. "Premier team" finished third in the Ulster Basketball League premier division, won the Errigle Inn Tournament and reached finals of All Ireland Club Championship. The division one squad finished third in the Ulster Basketball League first division.

2004/05 Season
"Premier team" finished fourth in the Ulster Basketball League premier division, reached the final of Errigle Inn Tournament and reached the semi-final of the All Ireland club championship. The division one squad finished fourth in Ulster Basketball League first division.

2005/06 Season
"Premier team" finished seventh in the Ulster Basketball League premier division. The division one squad finished third in the Ulster Basketball League first division.

2006/07 Season
The "Premier team" finished fifth in the Ulster Basketball League premier division. The division one squad finished seventh in Ulster Basketball League first division.
The "U14's boys team" won the Peace Players International Spring Jam Competition and the u17 Girls won the BNI u17 Girls b League.

2007/08 Season
The "Premier team" finished fifth in the Basketball Northern Ireland premier division. The division one squad finished fifth in the Basketball Northern Ireland League first division and went on to win the BNI Plate. Both the under 13 and under 17 Girls won their junior championships.

References

External links
North Star Basketball Club
Official Basketball Northern Ireland website

Basketball teams in Northern Ireland
Basketball teams established in 2002
Sport in Derry (city)
2002 establishments in Northern Ireland